Wegdraai is a town in ZF Mgcawu District Municipality in the Northern Cape province of South Africa.

References

Populated places in the !Kheis Local Municipality